The Grinderwald is a mixed forest and a low hill range, up to , in Hanover Region and the Lower Saxon district of Nienburg/Weser in Germany.

Geology 
The Grinderwald is an Old Drift plateau that was formed from deposits of boulders and debris during the Ice Age.

Hills 
Amongst the high points in the hillocky terrain of the Grinderwalds are the following, sorted by height in metres (m) above sea level (NN): 

 Hüttenberg (101 m)
 Himberg (98.8 m)
 Eckberge (91 m)
 Lichtenberg (85.4 m)
 Masekersberg (83.1 m)
 Spielberg (76.0 m)
 Lehmberg (72.8 m)
 Reihersberg (71 m)
 Brand (67.3 m)
 Uhlenberg (65.8 m)
 Saalhorstberg (62 m)

References 

Forests and woodlands of Lower Saxony